Jarosław Janowski (born 2 April 1967) is a Polish rower. He competed in the men's quadruple sculls event at the 1992 Summer Olympics.

References

1967 births
Living people
Polish male rowers
Olympic rowers of Poland
Rowers at the 1992 Summer Olympics
People from Więcbork